SS El Estero was a ship filled with ammunition that caught fire at dockside in New York Harbor in 1943, but was successfully moved away and sunk by the heroic efforts of tug boats and fireboats, averting a major disaster.

The ship 
The El Estero was built as a general cargo steamship for the Southern Pacific Steamship Lines at the Downey Shipbuilding Yard in Staten Island, New York and delivered for service in September 1920. The first of three sister ships built for the line, El Estero was operated by the Morgan Line in the Coastwise trade primarily between the ports of New York City, Baltimore and Galveston for much of her commercial service life.

Acquired by the US Maritime Commission on June 10, 1941, as part of an effort to increase US-Flag merchant marine shipping capacity, El Estero was purchased from Southern Pacific and placed operation with United States Lines under a Panamanian registry. Pressed into service carrying war supplies from the United States to Europe during World War II, the ship made several Atlantic crossings in convoys which frequently came under U-boat attack, including Convoy PQ 13 in March 1942. Continued this duty until Jan. 4, 1943. On Jan. 4, 1943 operation of the ship was turned over to William J. Rountree Company.El Estero put into New York Harbor in early April 1943 where she waited her turn to load munitions at the long finger pier of the New York Port of Embarkation's Caven Point Terminal off Jersey City, New Jersey.

The fire
With loading completed on April 24, 1943, El Estero had taken on 1,365 tons of mixed munitions and was preparing to depart at approximately 5:30PM when a boiler flashback started a fire on oily water in her bilges which quickly grew out of control.

The initial report of fire aboard El Estero brought an immediate response of five fire trucks from the Jersey City Fire Department, two 30-foot fireboats and roughly 60 volunteers from the U.S. Coast Guard to battle and contain the flames aboard the ship, which was moored directly opposite two other fully loaded ammunition ships and two ammunition-laden consists of railroad boxcars. With over 5,000 tons of ammunition (comparable to a tactical nuclear weapon) now in immediate danger of being set off by the fire on El Estero and with memories of the Black Tom explosion fresh on the minds of many at the scene, fire fighting efforts began in earnest. It was quickly discovered that the location and intensity of the fire prevented access to the ships' seacocks, making any attempt at scuttling the ship impossible, and the call went out to the New York City Fire Department, which in turn dispatched its two most powerful fireboats; Fire Fighter and John J. Harvey, to the scene.

Arriving at 6:30 pm and immediately running hoses up to Coast Guardsmen on the burning ship, the fireboats took positions directly alongside El Estero as a trio of commercial tugboats made up a towline to her bow and began pulling her off the Caven Point Pier towards open waters on through The Narrows. Despite the high probability of the ship's volatile cargo exploding at any moment, the Coast Guardsmen, fire fighters and tug crews continued their efforts to contain the fire on El Estero to save as much of the ship and cargo as possible, but shortly after the tow began the Port Admiral of New York Harbor ordered the ship sunk. Shifting to a shallow area of water near Robbins Reef Light in Upper New York Bay, the fireboats began pumping their combined maximum capacity of 38,000 gallons of water per minute into El Estero'''s cargo holds, which succeeded in swamping the ship and sent her to the bottom shortly after 9PM with much of her superstructure still above the surface. With all hotspots declared extinguished by 11:30PM on the 24th, the all-clear for residents and businesses ringing New York Harbor was transmitted over the radio and what is considered to have been the single greatest threat to New York City during World War II passed without major incident or loss of life.

Aftermath
With a shroud of secrecy soon in place over the events surrounding the sinking of El Estero due in large part to the then-classified mission of the Caven Point Army Depot, public knowledge of the near disaster remained low until 1944 when the first of several awards for heroism were distributed to the first responders. El Estero herself would remain in her sunken state for the better part of four months before the still-loaded ship was finally raised from the seafloor and towed out of the harbor for use as a naval gunnery target.

Her untimely end and its legacy are still very much visible today in the modern-day Sandy Hook Bay, where in August 1943 the US Navy began construction of a new ammunition depot in New Jersey, now known as Naval Weapons Station Earle which features a 2.9-mile pier designed to move the hazardous activity of loading and unloading munitions away from densely populated areas.  Over half a century later, both the Fire Fighter and John J. Harvey'', the latter then a museum ship, helped fight fires at Ground Zero in the aftermath of the September 11, 2001 attacks.

References

See also
List of accidents and incidents involving transport or storage of ammunition

History of the United States Coast Guard
Maritime incidents in April 1943
Military history of New York City
New York City Fire Department
1943 fires in the United States
Ship fires
World War II merchant ships of Panama
1920 ships
Ships built in Staten Island